An aromatised wine (also spelled aromatized) is a fortified wine or mistelle that has been flavoured with herbs, spices, fruit or other natural flavourings.

Description
An aromatised wine must have a minimum alcohol content of 14.5% by volume and a maximum alcohol content of 22% by volume according to EU law Council Regulation (EEC) No 1601/91. The majority of older brands come from France and Italy but there are now a range of small 'craft' producers around the world.

Other similar beverages described in this legislation are 'aromatised wine-based drinks' (non-fortified) and 'aromatised wine-product cocktail' (blended, lower alcohol drink under 7% ABV).

Varieties of aromatised wine

Vermouth
Vermouth is the most widely used aromatised wine due to its use in cocktails and famous commercial brands such as Martini and Cinzano which are commonplace around the world. Vermouth can be sweet or dry and red, white, pink or orange. It is traditionally flavoured with an infusion of herbs, peels and spices, including wormwood but modern commercial brands are likely to be made with a sweet concentrate of flavours to maintain consistency and low-cost. Other brands include Punt e Mes, Noilly Prat and Carpano.

Aromatised wine-based aperitifs
Aromatised wine-based aperitifs are a range of beverages related to vermouth but can be flavoured with many botanicals including cinchona bark (the source of quinine), gentian root and fruit, and typically don't contain wormwood, or flavours of wormwood, that vermouths historically have. Two types include Quinquina and Americano.

Quinquina

Quinquina uses cinchona as a main flavouring ingredient. Brands of this type of aromatised wine aperitif include Lillet, Dubonnet and Byrrh.

Americano
Americano uses gentian root as the main flavouring ingredient. The name comes from the French 'Amer' meaning bitter, rather than any reference to 'America'. Brands of this type of aromatised wine aperitif include  Cocchi Americano and Vergano Americano.

Lillet
Lillet is a French aromatised wine which from 1887 to 1986 contained quinine.  The white (blanc) version was an ingredient in "Gin and French" especially popular in Victorian London, similar to a martini or "Gin and It" using vermouth.

See also

 Spiced wine
 Ginger wine
 Mulled wine
 Sangria

References